Chamelophyton is a genus of orchids. , only one species is known, Chamelophyton kegelii, native to Suriname and Venezuela.

References 

Monotypic Epidendroideae genera
Pleurothallidinae genera
Pleurothallidinae
Orchids of Suriname
Orchids of Venezuela